Chang Yong-ae is a North Korean former track and field runner who competed in the 800 metres and 1500 metres. She won a middle-distance double at the 1982 Asian Games, taking gold medals in both 800 m and 1500 m in Asian record times.

She was the first Korean to win the Asian 800 m title and succeeded her compatriot Kim Ok-sun to the 1500 m title in 1982. She set a 4 × 400 metres relay national record at the 1978 Asian Games, where she was an 800 m bronze medallist behind her compatriot Jung Dong-sun. She was also a silver medallist in the 800 m at the 1979 Asian Athletics Championships, finishing behind South Korea's Chung Byong-Soon.

International competitions

References

Living people
Year of birth missing (living people)
North Korean female middle-distance runners
Asian Games gold medalists for North Korea
Asian Games bronze medalists for North Korea
Athletes (track and field) at the 1978 Asian Games
Athletes (track and field) at the 1982 Asian Games
Asian Games medalists in athletics (track and field)
Medalists at the 1978 Asian Games
Medalists at the 1982 Asian Games